Sir William Pollard Byles (13 February 1839 – 15 October 1917) was a British newspaper owner and radical Liberal politician.

Background
Born in Bradford, Yorkshire, in 1839, W P Byles was the son of William Byles, proprietor of the Bradford Observer and Anna Holden of Halifax. He eventually succeeded his father as owner of the newspaper, which had been renamed the Yorkshire Observer. He married Sarah Anne Unwin of Colchester in 1865. They had no children. He was knighted in 1911.

Political career
In 1892 he was elected as Liberal Member of Parliament for Shipley. Upon election he became a member of the Interparliamentary Union for Peace and Arbitration. He lost his seat three years later to Fortescue Flannery, his Conservative opponent. Byles was a pacifist, and actively opposed the Second Boer War. In 1900 he stood on an anti-war ticket as Labour Representation Committee candidate at Leeds East, but was defeated. He returned to the Commons at the 1906 general election as Liberal MP for Salford North. He was an advanced radical, a strong supporter of Irish Home Rule and an advocate of Land Reform. Byles retained his seat until his death.

Labour relations
Byles sought to improve relations between the Liberal Party and the Independent Labour Party. The 1896 Bradford East by-election was an opportunity for the Liberals to re-gain a seat they had lost to the Conservatives in 1895. However, Keir Hardie had decided to intervene as an ILP candidate, making the contest three-way. In an effort to prevent the Conservative winning due to a split ant-Tory vote, Byles attempted to resolve the situation by suggesting himself as a compromise candidate that both parties could support. Hardie re-buffed his overture and the Conservatives held the seat with Hardie finishing a poor third. 
For his 1900 Leeds candidature, Byles was endorsed as candidate by the Leeds Trades Council who then sought to get him endorsed by the Liberal Association. However, it soon became clear that Byles did not have the full support of all trades with the council's Secretary also seeking the nomination. The Liberals thus chose not to endorse Byles and instead adopt another candidate. Byles decided to run anyway and surprisingly, the Labour Representation Committee stepped in and endorsed him, to the annoyance of many in the local Trades Council who would have happily supported a 'Liberal-Labour' candidate. Byles had thus ended up creating a situation in 1900 that he had sought to avoid in 1896. The outcome of the Leeds East contest was similar to the Bradford East by-election with the Conservative winning due to a split vote. 
Throughout this period and his career in its entirety, Byles remained a member of the Liberal Party and always took the Liberal whip in the House of Commons. Although he was not a trade unionist, at every election in which he stood he was able to secure the support of his local Trades Council, which is why he is frequently described as 'Liberal-Labour'.

Electoral record

Sir William Pollard Byles died in October 1917 at his home in Hampstead, London, aged 78.

References

External links
 

1839 births
1917 deaths
Liberal Party (UK) MPs for English constituencies
UK MPs 1892–1895
UK MPs 1906–1910
UK MPs 1910
UK MPs 1910–1918
Politicians from Bradford
Members of the Parliament of the United Kingdom for Salford North
Liberal-Labour (UK) MPs